Ali Ahmad Mteirek (15 January 1978 – 24 July 2014) was a Lebanese footballer who played as a centre-back. He represented the Lebanon national team between 1998 and 2006.

Club career 

Mteirek began his senior career at Bourj, before moving to Tadamon Sour, with whom he won the Lebanese FA Cup in 2001. He joined Olympic Beirut in 2002, winning the domestic double (league and cup) in 2003. Mtairek won the league title with Ansar in 2006. He also played for Ahed, Shabab Sahel, Khoyol, and Sagesse.

International career 
Mteirek represented Lebanon at the 1998 Asian Games.

Death 
On 24 July 2014, Mteirek died of electrocution in his home in Beirut, aged 36.

Honours 
Tadamon Sour
 Lebanese FA Cup: 2000–01

Olympic Beirut
 Lebanese Premier League: 2002–03
 Lebanese FA Cup: 2002–03

Ansar
 Lebanese Premier League: 2005–06

Individual
 Lebanese Premier League Team of the Season: 2005–06, 2006–07

References

External links
 
 
 
 

1978 births
2014 deaths
People from Baabda District
Lebanese footballers
Association football central defenders
Bourj FC players
Tadamon Sour SC players
Olympic Beirut players
Al Ansar FC players
Al Ahed FC players
Shabab Al Sahel FC players
Al Khoyol FC players
Sagesse SC footballers
Lebanese Premier League players
Lebanese Second Division players
Lebanon international footballers
Asian Games competitors for Lebanon
Footballers at the 1998 Asian Games
Accidental deaths by electrocution